MV Loch Tarbert is a Caledonian Maritime Assets Limited ro-ro car ferry, built in 1992 and currently operated by Caledonian MacBrayne. She has spent most of her career on the seasonal Claonaig – Lochranza crossing.

History
MV Loch Tarbert was built in 1992 by JW Miller & Sons Ltd of St Monans.

Layout
Loch Tarbert is a variant on 's design. Her car deck has capacity for 18 cars. Passenger accommodation for 150 passengers is in a starboard lounge and on two outer decks. A large funnel on the opposite side to her wheelhouse is painted in CalMac livery.

Service
MV Loch Tarbert replaced  on the seasonal Claonaig – Lochranza crossing in July 1992, operating this crossing in summers until 2016. In winters, she has relieved at Fishnish, Colintraive and Largs. She provided additional dangerous loads sailings from Largs to Lochranza until the service from Tarbert to Arran started.

In early 1996, she opened the new Otternish – Leverburgh route across the Sound of Harris, awaiting new . 
During a seaman's strike in 2000, Arran traffic was diverted to the Loch Fyne and Claonaig crossings.
At the end of recent summers, Loch Tarbert has moved to Tarbert to start a winter service to Portavadie, with a lunchtime sailing to Arran. The service is usually taken over by one of the smaller Loch Class. Loch Tarbert usually relieves at Largs, however  spends most of the winter as a spare vessel.

Loch Tarbert was replaced on the Claonaig–Lochranza crossing in September 2016 by the  – the third of Caledonian MacBrayne's hybrid ferries – and she became a spare/relief vessel that winter. In summer 2017, Loch Tarbert became the dedicated vessel on the Tobermory to Kilchoan route owing to rising vehicle traffic on that route. Loch Tarbert displaced  in the process.

In January and February 2022, Loch Tarbert operated a temporary timetable of two to three return sailings per day from Tarbert to Lochranza, Arran. This temporary timetable was extended when Caledonian Isles' return from annual overhaul was delayed.

References

External links

MV Tarbert on www.calmac.co.uk

Caledonian MacBrayne
1992 ships
Ships built in Scotland